Richard Robbins (born in Los Angeles) is an American poet. He grew up in Southern California and Montana.
He graduated from San Diego State University, and University of Montana, with an M.F.A. in 1979, where he studied with Richard Hugo and Madeline DeFrees.
Before his recent retirement, he taught for 37 years at Minnesota State University, Mankato,


Awards
 Frontier Award
 The Loft Award of Distinction in Poetry
 Minnesota State Arts Board Fellowship
 National Endowment for the Arts Fellowship
 Writer Magazine/Emily Dickinson Award, from the Poetry Society of America.
 Hawthornden Fellowship.

Works
Body Turn to Rain: New and Selected Poems, Lynx House Press, 2017, 
Other Americas, Blueroad Press, 2010. 
Radioactive City, Bellday Books, 2009. 

Toward New Weather [chapbook], Frontier Award Committee, 1978

Editors

References

Year of birth missing (living people)
Living people
American male poets
San Diego State University alumni
University of Montana alumni
Minnesota State University, Mankato faculty
University of Nebraska Omaha faculty